Pattoki Tehsil , is an administrative subdivision (tehsil) of Kasur District in the Punjab province of Pakistan. The market town of Pattoki is the headquarters of the tehsil.

Administration
The tehsil of Pattoki is administratively subdivided into 32 Union Councils, these are:

References

Kasur District
Tehsils of Punjab, Pakistan